The 1989 480 km of Suzuka was the first round of the 1989 World Sportscar Championship season. It took place at Suzuka Circuit, Japan on April 9, 1989.

Official results
Class winners in bold. Cars failing to complete 75% of winner's distance marked as Not Classified (NC).

† - The #108 Roy Baker Racing entry was disqualified after the race for receiving assistance at the race start.

Statistics
 Pole position - #37 Toyota Team Tom's - 1:50.635
 Fastest lap - #1 Silk Cut Jaguar - 1:57.549
 Average speed - 170.596 km/h

References

 

Suzuka
Suzuka